Ansienulina is a genus of spiders in the jumping spider family Salticidae. It was first described in 2015 by Wanda Wesołowska. This genus was named in honour of South African arachnologist Ansie Dippenaar-Schoeman. , it contains only one species, Ansienulina mirabilis, found in Kenya, Angola, and Namibia.

Wesołowska placed the genus in the subfamily Thiratoscirtinae, which Maddison reduced to the subtribe Thiratoscirtina in the Salticoida clade of the subfamily Salticinae.

References

Salticidae
Monotypic Salticidae genera
Spiders of Africa
Taxa named by Wanda Wesołowska